Güngören M. Yahya Baş Stadyumu is a multi-purpose stadium in the Güngören district of Istanbul, Turkey.

It is currently used mostly for football matches and is the home stadium of İstanbul Güngörenspor. The stadium holds 7,500 people.

Football venues in Turkey
Sports venues in Istanbul
Multi-purpose stadiums in Turkey
İstanbulspor
Güngören